KBJM (1400 AM) is a radio station licensed to serve Lemmon, South Dakota.  The station is owned by Media Associates, Inc. It airs a full-service Country music format during the day and an Oldies music format during the evening and overnight. KBJM Radio is located at 500 1st Avenue East in Lemmon, the transmitter site is southwest of town on Township Road.

The station was assigned these call letters by the Federal Communications Commission.

References

External links
FCC History Cards for KBJM
KBJM official website

BJM
Country radio stations in the United States
Oldies radio stations in the United States
Radio stations established in 1988